Tyler Alexander Black (born July 26, 2000) is a Canadian professional baseball second baseman for the Milwaukee Brewers organization. He played college baseball with the Wright State Raiders.

Amateur career
Black grew up in Toronto and attended St. Andrew's College, Aurora. He went undrafted out of high school and enrolled at Wright State University to play college baseball.

As a freshman at Wright State in 2019, Black was named the Horizon League Freshman of the Year and first team All-Conference after batting .353 with seven home runs, 41 RBIs, and 23 total extra-base hits. He batted .239 in 13 games during his sophomore season in 2020 before it was cut short due to the coronavirus pandemic. As a redshirt sophomore in 2021, Black hit .383 with 14 doubles, 13 home runs and 59 RBIs and was named first team All-Horizon League.

Professional career
Black was selected with the 33rd overall selection of the 2021 Major League Baseball draft by the Milwaukee Brewers. He signed with the Brewers for a $2.2 million signing bonus.

Black made his professional debut with Rookie-level Arizona Complex League Brewers and was promoted to the Carolina Mudcats of the Low-A East during the season. Over 26 games between the two teams, he slashed .241/.426/.322 with one home run, eight RBIs, 31 strikeouts and 26 walks over 87 at-bats. He opened the 2022 season with the Wisconsin Timber Rattlers of the High-A Midwest League.

Personal life
Black is the son of sports announcer Rod Black.

References

External links

Wright State Raiders bio

2000 births
Living people
Baseball second basemen
Wright State Raiders baseball players
Baseball people from Ontario
Sportspeople from Toronto
Arizona Complex League Brewers players
Carolina Mudcats players
Wisconsin Timber Rattlers players